The Arab Union is a theoretical political union of the Arab states. The term was first used when the British Empire promised the Arabs a united independent state in return for revolting against the Ottoman Empire, with whom Britain was at war. It never came to fruition following the Sykes–Picot Agreement. Despite this, many in the Arab world have since called for the creation of a pan-Arab state. Egyptian President Gamal Abdel Nasser made several unsuccessful attempts to unite Egypt with other Arab countries (including Iraq and North Yemen), and briefly succeeded in forming the United Arab Republic with Syria in 1958, which dissolved in 1971. Similar attempts were made by other Arab leaders, such as Hafez al-Assad, Ahmed Hassan al-Bakr, Faisal I of Iraq, Muammar Gaddafi, Saddam Hussein, Gaafar Nimeiry and Anwar Sadat.

Proposals
In the 2004 Arab League summit in Cairo, Yemeni President Ali Abdullah Saleh proposed the creation of an Arab Union replacing the Arab League for a stronger political and geographical body, capable of dealing with world issues. However, the proposal failed to reach the League's agenda.

During the Arab Spring in 2011, Saudi Arabia raised a proposal to transform the Gulf Cooperation Council into a "Gulf Union" with tighter economic, political and military coordination, regarded as a move to counterbalance the Iranian influence in the region. Objections were raised against the proposal by other countries. In 2014, Bahrain prime minister Khalifa bin Salman Al Khalifa said that current events in the region highlighted the importance of the proposal.

Failed unifications
Fertile Crescent Plan
United Arab Republic
Arab Federation
United Arab States
Unified Political Command
Union of Arab Republics (1972)
Federation of Arab Republics
Arab Islamic Republic
King Hussein's federation plan

Successful unifications
Unification of Saudi Arabia
United Arab Emirates
Yemeni unification

See also
Arab League
Arab nationalism
List of proposed state mergers
Middle East economic integration
Pan-Arabism

References

Arab League
Continental unions
Pan-Arabism
Proposed political unions
Proposed international organizations